Egidio Valenti  (died 9 May 1568) was a Roman Catholic prelate who served as Bishop of Nepi e Sutri (1566–1568).

Biography
Egidio Valenti was appointed a priest in the Order of Saint Augustine. 
On 25 October 1566, he was appointed during the papacy of Pope Pius V as Bishop of Nepi e Sutri. On 28 October 1566, he was consecrated bishop by Scipione Rebiba, Cardinal-Priest of Sant'Angelo in Pescheria, with Girolamo Maccabei de Toscanella, Bishop of Castro del Lazio, and Adriano Fuscone, Bishop of Aquino, serving as co-consecrators. 
He served as Bishop of Nepi e Sutri until his death on 9 May 1568.

Episcopal succession
While bishop, he was the principal consecrator of:

and the principal co-consecrator of:

See also 
Catholic Church in Italy

References

External links and additional sources
 (for Chronology of Bishops) 
 (for Chronology of Bishops) 

16th-century Italian Roman Catholic bishops
Bishops appointed by Pope Pius V
1568 deaths
Augustinian bishops